Jeppe Tengbjerg (born 28 December 1973) is a Danish football manager and former football player. In his playing career, Tengbjerg represented a number of Danish clubs, as well as Dutch clubs SC Cambuur and Excelsior Rotterdam.

In 2005, he started his management career as playing manager of Slagelse B&I. He continued to manage the club, when it in 2008 changed its name to FC Vestsjælland. In March 2009 he was fired due to poor results and replaced by Michael Schjønberg. In June 2009 he was named new manager of B93.

In June 2011 he replaced Jesper Tollefsen as manager of Lolland-Falster Alliancen.

References 

1973 births
Living people
Danish men's footballers
Danish football managers
Denmark under-21 international footballers
Denmark youth international footballers
Danish 1st Division players
Næstved Boldklub players
SC Cambuur players
Excelsior Rotterdam players
Ikast FS players
Hvidovre IF players
Danish expatriate men's footballers
Expatriate footballers in the Netherlands
Boldklubben af 1893 players
Boldklubben af 1893 managers
FC Vestsjælland managers
Association football midfielders